Typhoon Babe, known in Japan as , and in the Philippines as Typhoon Miling, was regarded as "the worst typhoon to threaten Japan in 18 years." Developing as a tropical depression on September 2, Babe initially tracked west-northwestward as it intensified. On September 5, an abrupt shift in steering currents caused the system to turn north-northwestward. Early on September 6, the system intensified into a typhoon. Not long after reaching this strength, another shift in the steering patterns caused the typhoon to execute a prolonged counter-clockwise arc, causing it to track through the Ryukyu Islands southwest of Japan, as it interacted with a low pressure originating from the Korean Peninsula. During this time, the system gradually weakened and eventually it made landfall near Shanghai, China on September 11 as a minimal typhoon before dissipating inland the following day. Coincidentally, Typhoon Babe and Atlantic Hurricane Babe existed at the same time from September 3–9.

Passing through the Ryukyu Islands as a powerful typhoon, Babe caused considerable damage in the region. More than 1,000 homes were destroyed and nearly 7,000 more were damaged or flooded. One person was killed on Amami Ōshima and 77 others were injured throughout the country. Total losses reached ¥6.1 billion (US$23 million). Offshore, over 100 vessels were affected by the storm, including a Panamanian freighter where 13 people died. In China, more than 24,000 homes were destroyed and nine people were killed.

Meteorological history

In late August 1977, an area of disturbed weather was noted south of Pohnpei. By September 1, a weak surface low accompanied by organized convection developed within the disturbance. Situated to the south of a tropical upper tropospheric trough, conditions were favorable for further organization and the Joint Typhoon Warning Center (JTWC) issued a Tropical Cyclone Formation Alert for the system. Tracking steadily west-northwestward in response to a well-developed subtropical ridge extending from the International Date Line to China, the system was soon classified a tropical depression early on September 2. Due to the cyclone's proximity to the Philippines, the Philippine Atmospheric, Geophysical and Astronomical Services Administration (PAGASA) also monitored the storm and assigned it with the local name Miling.

Initially, forecasters anticipated Babe to maintain its westward course as it strengthened and threaten the Philippines; however, its forward motion gradually slowed as it neared the region. On September 5, an upper-level trough formed over northeastern Asia and created a weakness in the subtropical ridge, allowing Babe to turn north-northwestward. Over the following two days, the storm quickly strengthened as divergence increased ahead of the storm, with Babe attaining typhoon status early on September 6 Between 0832 UTC on September 5 and 2204 UTC on September 7, the storm's barometric pressure dropped from 988 mbar (hPa) to 907 mbar (hPa), approximately 1.3 mbar (hPa) per hour. This ranked it as the first and only super typhoon of the 1977 season.

Until September 8, Babe was forecast to continue northwestward into Taiwan and later China; however, another upper-level trough moved into northeastern China and further weakened the ridge. This in turn allowed a new area of low pressure to develop over the Korean Peninsula and cause Babe to curve northeastward. While moving northeastward, Babe gradually weakened and began to undergo a Fujiwhara-like interaction with the low near Korea as that system moved southwestward. Accelerating along a counter-clockwise arc, Babe moved through the Ryukyu Islands as a weakening typhoon on September 9 before taking a steady westward course into China. As the system passed through the archipelago, a pressure of 907.3 mbar (hPa) was measured on Okinoerabujima. Babe eventually made landfall near Shanghai with winds of  before rapidly weakening over land. The system was last noted early on September 12 over Anhui Province.

Impact

Torrential rain fell across much of the Ryukyu Islands, Shikoku, and Kyushu. Nearly two-thirds of the homes across the island were damaged or destroyed by the storm and 73 people were injured. Most of the injuries across the island were caused by collapsing buildings. One person was killed on Amami Ōshima and 77 others were injured across the Amami Islands. According to Japanese police, 1,146 homes were destroyed, mainly by flooding and landslides, while 1,097 more were damaged and another 5,826 were flooded. At least 14,927 people were left homeless. Losses across the country amounted to ¥6.1 billion (US$23 million).

The Japanese Maritime Safety Agency deployed five airplanes and four patrol boats to search for survivors. Additionally, ten Japanese fishing boats in the area assisted in search and rescue. By September 12, rescuers found nine sailors and thirteen bodies, while three others remained missing. Elsewhere in the East China Sea, approximately 100 Japanese fishing vessels attempting to seek shelter from the storm were damaged.

In China, wind gusts reportedly reached , resulting in extensive damage. Around 24,000 homes were destroyed and nine people were killed.

See also

 List of tropical cyclones
 1977 Pacific typhoon season
 1977 Atlantic hurricane season

References

External links

Joint Typhoon Warning Center 

1977 Pacific typhoon season
Typhoons in Japan
Typhoon Babe
Typhoon Babe
Typhoons
Typhoons in China